Santin is an O-methylated flavonol. It was isolated from Tanacetum microphyllum.

References 

O-methylated flavonols
Flavonoids found in Asteraceae